Poshtkuh Rural District is in the Central District of Firuzkuh County, Tehran province, Iran. At the National Census of 2006, its population was 4,560 in 1,174 households. There were 4,267 inhabitants in 1,432 households at the following census of 2011. At the most recent census of 2016, the population of the rural district was 2,745 in 1,007 households. The largest of its 31 villages was Torud, with 458 people.

References 

Firuzkuh County

Rural Districts of Tehran Province

Populated places in Tehran Province

Populated places in Firuzkuh County